Joseph Norman Elliott (May 12, 1894 – January 21, 1959) was an American college football and college basketball coach, minor league baseball player, and otolaryngologist. Elliott served two seasons as the head basketball coach at Northwestern University, in 1917–18 and 1919–20, compiling a record of 10–11.  He also coached freshmen football at Northwestern during that time.  Elliott moved to Illinois Wesleyan University in 1930 as an assistant football coach and was the head football coach there from 1931 to 1934, tallying a mark of 19–11–4.  Elliott attended Illinois Wesleyan, where he was captain of the basketball team in  1913–14 and 1915–16. He played baseball with the Bloomington Bloomers of the Illinois–Indiana–Iowa League in 1917. Elliott graduated from Northwestern University Medical School—now known as the Feinberg School of Medicine—in 1920.  Elliott's sons, Bump Elliott and Pete Elliott, both played college football at the University of Michigan and went on to coaching careers.

Head coaching record

Football

Basketball

References

External links
 
 

1894 births
1959 deaths
American otolaryngologists
Bloomington Bloomers players
Illinois Wesleyan Titans football coaches
Illinois Wesleyan Titans men's basketball players
Northwestern Wildcats football coaches
Northwestern Wildcats men's basketball coaches
Feinberg School of Medicine alumni
People from Bloomington, Illinois
Baseball players from Illinois
Basketball coaches from Illinois
Basketball players from Illinois
American men's basketball players
20th-century surgeons